Elena Burkard (born 10 February 1992) is a German long-distance runner. In 2019, she competed in the senior women's race at the 2019 IAAF World Cross Country Championships held in Aarhus, Denmark. She finished in 23rd place. She also competed in the women's 3000 metres steeplechase event at the 2020 Summer Olympics held in Tokyo, Japan.

In 2018, she won the silver medal in the women's 1500 metres at the 2018 German Athletics Championships held in Nuremberg, Germany. In the same year, she also represented Germany at the 2018 European Athletics Championships held in Berlin, Germany. She finished in 6th place in the women's 3000 metres steeplechase with a personal best of 9:29.76. In 2019, she won the gold medal in the women's cross-country 5.1 km event at the 2019 German Athletics Championships held in Berlin, Germany.

Achievements

NCAA

References

External links 

 
 
 Elena Burkard bio San Francisco Dons

Living people
1992 births
Place of birth missing (living people)
German female long-distance runners
German female cross country runners
German female steeplechase runners
German national athletics champions
People from Freudenstadt (district)
Sportspeople from Karlsruhe (region)
Athletes (track and field) at the 2020 Summer Olympics
Olympic athletes of Germany
21st-century German women